A Portrait of Ray is a studio album by Ray Charles released in March 1968.

Track listing 
 "Never Say Naw" (Percy Mayfield) – 3:06
 "The Sun Died" (Ray Charles, Ann Grégory, Hubert Giraud, Pierre Delanoë) – 3:58
 "Am I Blue?" (Harry Akst, Grant Clarke) – 4:13
 "Yesterdays" (Jerome Kern, Otto Harbach) – 4:40
 "When I Stop Dreaming'" (Ira Louvin, Charlie Louvin) – 3:04
 "I Won't Leave" (Lou Courtney, Luther Ingram, Robert Bateman) – 3:32
 "A Sweet Young Thing Like You" (Dee Ervin) – 2:18
 "The Bright Lights and You Girl" (Sayde Shepherd) – 2:39
 "Understanding" (Jimmy Holiday, Ray Charles) – 3:12
 "Eleanor Rigby" (John Lennon, Paul McCartney) – 2:57

Personnel
Ray Charles – vocals, piano, keyboards
F. Bryon Clark – engineering, remixing

Chart positions

External links 
 

Ray Charles albums
1968 albums
ABC Records albums
Tangerine Records (1962) albums